Kurd Maverick (born Cihan Ötün) is a German House producer and DJ.

Biography
He is of Kurdish origin.

Discography

Singles 
 2006: The Rub (I Never Rock)
 2006: Love Sensation 2006 (with Eddie Thoneick)
 2007: Let's Work
 2007: String of Tortuga
 2007: Rise! (mit Tapesh feat. Terri B!)
 2008: Let the Freak Out! (with Azin)
 2008: (All Over) The World
 2009: Love Emergency (with Sam Obernik)
 2009: Blue Monday
 2009: Ring Ring Ring (with Rud)
 2010: Shine a Light
 2011: N.Y.C (with Terri B! aka Terri Bjerre 
 2012: Hell Yeah
 2019: Lonely (with Eddie Thonekick featuring Errol Reid)

Remixes (selection) 
 2005: D.O.N.S. feat. Technotronic - Pump Up the Jam
 2006: Basement Jaxx - Take Me Back To Your House
 2006: Soul Avengerz feat. Javine - Don't Let The Morning Come
 2006: Full Intention - Soul Power
 2006: Robbie Williams - Lovelight
 2006: Chic Flowerz vs. Muriel Fowler - Gypsy Woman
 2006: Sonique - Tonight
 2006: John Dahlbäck - Nothing Is For Real 
 2007: Bob Sinclar - Everybody Movin'
 2007: Tim Deluxe feat. Simon Franks - Let The Beats Roll
 2008: Rosenstolz - Wie Weit Ist Vorbei
 2008: Eddie Thoneick - I Wanna Freak U 
 2009: Pet Shop Boys - Love Etc.
 2010: Boy George - Amazing Grace
 2010: Alex Gaudino - I'm In Love (I Wanna Do It)
 2010: Eddie Thoneick feat. Andy P. - Love Under Pressure

External links 
 
  Kurd Maverick on Myspace

References 

German trance musicians
German house musicians
German DJs
Living people
Year of birth missing (living people)
Place of birth missing (living people)
German people of Kurdish descent
Electronic dance music DJs
Kurdish DJs